Chemistry Lessons: Volume One is a studio album by British electronic musician Chris Carter. It was released on 30 March 2018, by Mute Records.

Release
On 9 January 2018, Carter announced the release of his first album in seventeen years, along with the first single "Blissters". Speaking on the release, Carter explained: "If there’s an influence on the album, it’s definitely ‘60s radiophonic. Over the last few years I’ve also been listening to old English folk music, almost like a guilty pleasure, and so some tracks on the album hark back to an almost ingrained DNA we have for those kinds of melodies. They’re not dissimilar to nursery rhymes in some ways."

Critical reception
Chemistry Lessons: Volume One was met with "universal acclaim" reviews from critics. At Metacritic, which assigns a weighted average rating out of 100 to reviews from mainstream publications, this release received an average score of 81 based on 11 reviews. Aggregator Album of the Year gave the release a 77 out of 100 based on a critical consensus of 5 reviews.

Paul Simpson of AllMusic explained the album was "created using a fusion of modular synthesizers, digital signal processing, drum machines, field recordings, and vocal manipulation." He also went on to say "the vocals on this album are androgynous, amorphous, and alien, and it's hard to tell if they're manipulated human voices or entirely synthetic." Kevin Press from Exclaim! gave the release an 8 out of 10, noting "the 67-minute album features 25 remarkably accessible tracks. Carter has also incorporated treated vocals he's field-recorded from a variety of sources. It adds real dimension to the album."

Accolades

Track listing

Charts

References

2018 albums
Mute Records albums